Knockanure is a village and civil parish in County Kerry, Ireland. It is near the town of Listowel and the village of Moyvane.

Amenities 
Knockanure has one church, The Church Of Corpus Christi, which was built in 1964. Scoil Chorp Chríost is the primary school in Knockanure. The pub is called Flynn's Bar.

Notable residents 
 Dan Keane (1919–2012), poet.

See also
The Valley of Knockanure

References 

Towns and villages in County Kerry
Civil parishes of County Kerry